Ivan Ionaș (20 December 1956 – 8 November 2014) was a Moldovan politician and a member of the Moldovan Parliament between 2010 and 2014.

Biography 
Ionas carried out his compulsory military service in the Soviet army from 1976 until 1978. He graduated from the Technical University of Moldova in 1989. He had been a member of the Parliament of Moldova since 2010. He died in Chișinău on 8 November 2014.

References

External links 
 Ionaş Ivan
 Curtea Constitutionala a validat mandatele a opt noi deputati

1956 births
2014 deaths
Liberal Democratic Party of Moldova MPs
Moldovan MPs 2009–2010